Urania (modern Greek shortened name  Ránia; meaning "heavenly" or "of heaven") was, in Greek mythology, the muse of astronomy. Urania is the goddess of astronomy and stars, her attributes being the globe and compass.

The muse Urania is sometimes confounded with Aphrodite Urania ("heavenly Aphrodite") because of their similar name.

Family 
Urania was the daughter of Zeus by Mnemosyne and also a great granddaughter of Uranus. Some accounts list her as the mother of the musician Linus by Apollo or Hermes or Amphimarus, son of Poseidon. Hymenaeus is also said to have been a son of Urania.

Function and representation 

Urania is often associated with Universal Love. Sometimes identified as the eldest of the divine sisters, Urania inherited Zeus' majesty and power and the beauty and grace of her mother Mnemosyne.

Urania dresses in a cloak embroidered with stars and keeps her eyes and attention focused on the Heavens. She is usually represented with a celestial globe to which she points with a little staff, and depicted in modern art with stars above her head. She is able to foretell the future by the arrangement of the stars.

Urania as Muse 

Those who are most concerned with philosophy and the heavens are dearest to her. Those who have been instructed by her she raises aloft to heaven, for it is a fact that imagination and the power of thought lift men's souls to heavenly heights.Urania, o'er her star-bespangled lyre,With touch of majesty diffused her soul;A thousand tones, that in the breast inspire,Exalted feelings, o er the wires'gan roll—How at the call of Jove the mist unfurled,And o'er the swelling vault—the glowing sky,The new-born stars hung out their lamps on high,And rolled their mighty orbs to music's sweetest sound.—From An Ode To Music by James G. PercivalDuring the Renaissance, Urania began to be considered the Muse for Christian poets. In the invocation to Book 7 of John Milton's epic poem Paradise Lost, the poet invokes Urania to aid his narration of the creation of the cosmos, though he cautions that it is "[t]he meaning, not the name I call" (7.5)

In popular culture

Urania in Astronomy and Navigation
 The planet Uranus, though mostly named after the Greek god personifying the sky, is also indirectly named after Urania.
 Urania is the namesake for astronomical observatories in Berlin, Budapest, Bucharest, Vienna, Zürich, Antwerp, and Uraniborg on the island of Hven. The main belt asteroid (30) Urania was also named after her.
 The official seal of the U.S. Naval Observatory portrays Urania. Hr.Ms. Urania is a sail training vessel for the Royal Netherlands Naval College. There has been a Hr. Ms. Urania in the Royal Netherlands Navy since 1832.
 Urania is featured on the seal of the Royal Astronomical Society of Canada, as well of its motto: Quo ducit Urania ("Where Urania leads").

Other uses of "Urania" 

 Urania is the name traditionally given to the eighth book of Herodotus' Histories.
 Aphrodite Urania (heavenly Aphrodite) is often an epithet given to Aphrodite in contrast with her more earthy aspect Aphrodite Pandemos (Aphrodite for all people).
 Urania is the muse for books 7 and 9  of Paradise Lost.

See also
 Muses in popular culture

References

Sources
 Diodorus Siculus, Library of History, Volume III: Books 4.59-8, translated by C. H. Oldfather, Loeb Classical Library No. 340, Cambridge, Massachusetts, Harvard University Press, 1939. . Online version at Harvard University Press. Online version by Bill Thayer.
 Hesiod, Theogony, in The Homeric Hymns and Homerica with an English Translation by Hugh G. Evelyn-White, Cambridge, Massachusetts, Harvard University Press; London, William Heinemann Ltd., 1914. Online version at the Perseus Digital Library. Internet Archive.
 Hyginus, Gaius Julius, Fabulae, in The Myths of Hyginus, edited and translated by Mary A. Grant, Lawrence: University of Kansas Press, 1960. Online version at ToposText.
 Ovid, Ovid's Fasti: With an English translation by Sir James George Frazer, London, William Heinemann Ltd.; Cambridge, Massachusetts, Harvard University Press, 1959. Internet Archive.
 Smith, William, Dictionary of Greek and Roman Biography and Mythology, London (1873). Online version at the Perseus Digital Library.

External links

 Urania: Goddess Muse of Astronomy, Theoi Project
 Britannica Online Encyclopedia
 Warburg Institute Iconographic Database (ca 50 images of Urania)

Greek Muses
Children of Zeus
Ancient Greek astronomy
Wisdom goddesses
Music and singing goddesses
Metamorphoses characters
Women of Apollo
Women of Hermes